Canyon Creek Food Company is a food processing company based in Edmonton, Alberta.

History
Canyon Creek Soup Company was started in December 1995 by David Vaughan and Dale Cook as a fresh soup company located in Edmonton. In 1996, the company went public on the TSX Venture Exchange under the name Canyon Creek Food Company. In 2001, majority shareholder Brian Halina took over the position of CEO as well as maintaining his position as chairman of the board.

In 2003 Brian Halina stepped down as CEO but maintained his position of chairman of the board. Terence Alty was named CEO and president of the company. The head office was then moved to Calgary, with the plant remaining in Edmonton.

In January 2010, due to the state of the economy, the management team decided to close the Calgary office and to have everything once again through the Edmonton plant.

See also
List of food companies
Soup

References

http://www.canadianbusiness.com/markets/cnw/article.jsp?content=20100504_222501_0_cnw_cnw
http://www.hoovers.com/company/Canyon_Creek_Food_Company_Ltd/rrkykji-1.html
https://web.archive.org/web/20121109132236/http://www.canada.com/edmontonjournal/story.html?id=80152994-06f8-46b7-ab2d-3f5a5bb96fc7&k=0
http://www.agric.gov.ab.ca/app68/foodindustry?section=category&cat1=Specialty+Foods

External links
Home page

Companies listed on the TSX Venture Exchange
Food and drink companies of Canada
Companies based in Edmonton